Ryan James Buchter (born February 13, 1987) is an American former professional baseball pitcher and the current assistant pitching coach for the Lehigh Valley IronPigs. He played in Major League Baseball (MLB) for the Atlanta Braves, San Diego Padres, Kansas City Royals, Oakland Athletics, Los Angeles Angels, and Arizona Diamondbacks.

Playing Career

Washington Nationals
Buchter was drafted by the Washington Nationals in the 33rd round of the 2005 Major League Baseball draft out of Highland Regional High School in Blackwood, New Jersey. He went on to play college baseball in the 2006 season at Gloucester County College in Sewell, New Jersey before ultimately signing with the Nationals. He began his professional career with the Gulf Coast Nationals in 2006 where he was 7.24 ERA in 11 games and made one start. In 2007 with the Vermont Lake Monsters of the New York–Penn League, he had a 6.82 ERA in 20 games. Buchter was promoted to the Hagerstown Suns of the South Atlantic League in 2008 and appeared in 13 games with a 3.26 ERA.

Chicago Cubs
Buchter was traded from the Nationals to the Chicago Cubs for fellow minor leaguer Matt Avery on November 3, 2008. He played for the Peoria Chiefs in the Class-A Midwest League in 2009 and had a 1.33 ERA in 38 games with five saves. The following season, 2010, he had a 7–2 record and a 4.65 ERA in 47 games for the Double-A Tennessee Smokies, which earned him a spot on the Southern League mid-season All-Star team. In 2011, he made 10 appearances for the Smokies and another six for the Daytona Cubs of the Florida State League.

Atlanta Braves
Buchter was then traded from the Cubs to the Atlanta Braves for Rodrigo López on May 26, 2011. He was promptly assigned to the Lynchburg Hillcats of the Carolina League, where he was 2–5 with a 3.59 ERA in 34 games with 15 saves. In 2012,  he began the season with the Double-A Mississippi Braves, where he was 3–1 with a 1.31 ERA in 35 games and also had four saves. He was again selected to the mid-season Southern League All-Star team. Afterwards, he was promoted to the Triple-A Gwinnett Braves where he pitched eight innings in nine games with a high 10.12 ERA. He played for the Phoenix Desert Dogs in the Arizona Fall League after the conclusion of the regular season.

The Braves added him to their 40-man roster on November 1, 2013 and he was named to the Braves' Opening Day roster for the 2014 season. He was sent back down to Gwinnett a few days later without appearing in a game. Buchter was called back up to Atlanta on June 20, 2014. He made his major league debut that night against the team that drafted him, the Washington Nationals, recording a strikeout and earning the win in an inning of extra inning work. That was his only appearance in the Majors and he spent the rest of the season with Gwinnett, where he pitched in 49 games with a 3.29 ERA. Buchter was outrighted off the Braves roster on September 26, 2014, and became a free agent.

Los Angeles Dodgers
Buchter signed a minor league contract with the Los Angeles Dodgers in January 2015 and received an invitation to spring training. He was assigned to the AAA Oklahoma City Dodgers and was selected to the mid-season Pacific Coast League all-star team. In 27 games he had a 1.65 ERA and exercised his opt out clause on July 20 to become a free agent.

Second Stint with Cubs
On July 24, 2015, Buchter signed a minor league deal with the Chicago Cubs. He finished the year with the Triple-A Iowa Cubs, recording a 2.00 ERA in 16 appearances. He became a free agent after the season.

San Diego Padres
Buchter signed a minor league deal with the San Diego Padres on December 8, 2015. On January 8, 2016, Buchter's contract was selected. In his two seasons with the Padres, Buchter owned an ERA of 2.93 with 125 strikeouts in over 100 innings.

Kansas City Royals
On July 24, 2017, the Padres traded Buchter, Trevor Cahill, and Brandon Maurer to the Kansas City Royals for Matt Strahm, Travis Wood, and Esteury Ruiz.

Oakland Athletics
On January 29, 2018, the Royals traded Buchter, Brandon Moss, and cash considerations to the Oakland Athletics for Jesse Hahn and Heath Fillmyer. In his first season with Oakland, Buchter posted an ERA of 2.75 in 60 appearances. He struck out 41 batters in  innings. Buchter was non-tendered by Oakland on December 2, 2019, and became a free agent.

Los Angeles Angels
On February 17, 2020, Buchter signed a minor league deal with the Los Angeles Angels, and received an invite to Spring Training. Buchter had his contract selected on March 22, 2020. Buchter was designated for assignment by the Angels on September 2, 2020. He was outrighted on September 4, but rejected his outright assignment and elected free agency two days later.

New York Yankees
On September 8, 2020, Buchter signed a minor league contract with the New York Yankees. He became a free agent on November 2, 2020.

Arizona Diamondbacks
On January 19, 2021, Buchter signed a minor league contract with the Arizona Diamondbacks organization. On May 27, 2021, Buchter was selected to the active roster. After posting a 5.52 ERA across 16 appearances, Buchter was designated for assignment on July 5. He was outrighted to the Triple-A Reno Aces on July 7. On July 30, his contract was selected by Arizona. On August 6, Buchter was returned to Reno. On August 20, Buchter was released by the Diamondbacks.

Seattle Mariners
On March 20, 2022, the Seattle Mariners signed Buchter to a minor league deal. On March 31, Buchter was released by the Mariners organization.

Coaching Career
On January 31, 2023, it was announced that Buchter had been hired as the assistant pitching coach for the Lehigh Valley IronPigs, the Triple-A affiliate of the Philadelphia Phillies.

Personal life
In 2021, Buchter began advocating for better mental health resources for professional baseball players, stating that the game had caused him to become a "depressed alcoholic" in 2016 and 2017 and that he felt he was a better player when drinking.

References

External links

1987 births
Living people
Sportspeople from Reading, Pennsylvania
Baseball players from Pennsylvania
Major League Baseball pitchers
Atlanta Braves players
San Diego Padres players
Kansas City Royals players
Oakland Athletics players
Los Angeles Angels players
Arizona Diamondbacks players
Gulf Coast Nationals players
Vermont Lake Monsters players
Hagerstown Suns players
Peoria Chiefs players
Tennessee Smokies players
Lynchburg Hillcats players
Daytona Cubs players
Mississippi Braves players
Phoenix Desert Dogs players
Gwinnett Braves players
Oklahoma City Dodgers players
Iowa Cubs players
Tomateros de Culiacán players
American expatriate baseball players in Mexico
Nashville Sounds players
Reno Aces players